Jounama Dam is a major ungated rockfill embankment dam across the Tumut River in the Snowy Mountains of New South Wales, Australia. The dam's main purpose is for the generation of hydro-power and is one of the sixteen major dams that comprise the Snowy Mountains Scheme, a vast hydroelectricity and irrigation complex constructed in south-east Australia between 1949 and 1974 and now run by Snowy Hydro.

The impounded reservoir is called the Jounama Pondage.

Location and features
The dam was constructed by Societe Dumez based on engineering plans developed under contract by the Snowy Mountains Hydroelectric Authority. Construction of the dam flooded the historic valley and town of Talbingo.

At 100% capacity the dam wall holds back  of water. The spillway is capable of discharging .

The Snowy Mountains Highway passes adjacent to the reservoir.

Power generation

A  small hydroelectric power station was completed in 2010 and is attached to the diverted flow of the Tumut River below the Jounama Dam wall. It is claimed that the small hydro facility generates enough energy to power  homes.

See also

 List of dams and reservoirs in New South Wales
 Snowy Hydro Limited
 Snowy Mountains Scheme

References

External links
 
.

Dams completed in 1968
Energy infrastructure completed in 2010
Snowy Mountains Scheme
Snowy Mountains Highway
Rock-filled dams
Embankment dams
Hydroelectric power stations in New South Wales
Dams in New South Wales
Dams in the Murray River basin